Van der Wal (or van de Wal, Vander Wal, Vanderwal, van de Wall, VanderWaal) is a toponymic surname of Dutch origin. The original bearer of the name may have lived or worked at or near a "wal": a river embankment, quay, or rampart. In 2007, Van de(r) Wal was the 47th most common surname in the Netherlands (15,646 people). In Belgium, the form Van de Walle is more abundant.

List
People with the name Van de(r) Wal include:

Dolf van der Wal (born 1985), Dutch snowboarder
 (born 1981), Dutch road cyclist
Frederique van der Wal (born 1967), Dutch fashion model
Gerrit van der Wal, Dutch president of KLM from 1965 to 1973
Grace VanderWaal (born 2004), American singer-songwriter
Henk van der Wal (1886–1982), Dutch Olympic runner
Ian Vander-Wal (born 1971), Australian Olympic swimmer
Jan Jaap van der Wal (born 1979), Dutch stand-up comedian
Jannes van der Wal (1956–1996), Dutch/Frisian draughts (checkers) world champion
 (1852–1908), Dutch-Indonesian pianist
John Vander Wal (born 1966), American baseball player
Kody Vanderwal (born 2001), American stock car driver
Laurel van der Wal (1924–2009), American aeronautical engineer
Marian van de Wal (born 1970), Dutch singer residing in Andorra
Marieke van der Wal (born 1979), Dutch handball goalkeeper
Nick van de Wall (born 1987), Dutch DJ better known as Afrojack
Rachael Vanderwal (born 1983), British basketball player
Rence van der Wal (born 1989), Dutch footballer
Ron Vanderwal (born 1938), American-Australian anthropologist and archeologist
Thomas Vander Wal (born 1966), American information architect

See also
Van der Waals (disambiguation)
Van de Walle
Wal (disambiguation)

References

Dutch-language surnames
Surnames of Dutch origin